Khedara is a town and commune in Souk Ahras Province in north-eastern Algeria. In 2008, the town was listed as having 8,329 residents.

References

Communes of Souk Ahras Province
Souk Ahras Province